Garikapati Narahari Sastry is an Indian chemist. He has taken charge as Director  of CSIR-North East Institute of Science and Technology, Jorhat, Assam on 19 February 2019. After taking charge as the Director, he has worked towards converting knowledge in the areas of computational modelling and Artificial intelligence from basic to translational research, by working closely with society and industry. Ultimately, revitalizing the strength of science and technology is essential in achieving the self-reliant and strong India. In the era of Industry 4.0 and 5.0, combining our traditional wisdom with modern science appear to be indispensable in the sectors such as Education, Health, Agriculture, Industrial and Societal development at large.
Prior to joining as the Director, he headed the Molecular Modelling Division at the CSIR Indian Institute of Chemical Technology in Hyderabad, India. Sastry has made pioneering contributions in the areas of computational chemistry and computational biology.

He was awarded Shanti Swarup Bhatnagar Prize for Science and Technology in 2011, the highest science award in India,  in the chemical sciences category.

Early life and education
G. N. Sastry completed his BSc (1985) and MSc (1988) from Osmania University. He earned his PhD from University of Hyderabad in Theoretical and Computational Chemistry under the supervision of Prof. E. D. Jemmis in 1995. Subsequently, he moved to Israel to carry out his first postdoctoral studies (1994 – 1996) with Prof. Sason Shaik in Hebrew University where he majorly focused on valance bond modelling and electronic transfer reactions. In 1996, he moved to Switzerland and did his second postdoctoral studies with Prof. Thomas Bally in University of Fibourg, Switzerland. In Switzerland he worked in Molecular modelling and theoretical and physical organic chemistry.

Career
After two postdoctoral stints, he moved to India and he has served as Assistant Professor in Pondicherry University for five years (1997 – 2002). There majorly focused on Molecular modelling and theoretical and physical organic chemistry. In 2002 he moved to CSIR – Indian Institute of Chemical Technology, Hyderabad where he served for almost two decades and made fundamental contributions in supramolecular chemistry which itself is a highly interdisciplinary areas. In 2019, he took charge as a Director in CSIR – North East Institute of Science and Technology, Jorhat, Assam. He also holds additional charge as Head of the Department of Advanced Computation and Data Sciences Division.

Scientific contributions
Sastry's group is highly interdisciplinary with diverse background that include chemistry, biology, material science, and computer science. With more than 300  research papers, which received over ~11000 citations, and an h-index of 52, he is one of the most prolific scientist in India making contributions in areas like noncovalent interactions, computer aided drug design, bucky bowl chemistry, and applications of machine learning in computational drug discovery. He is also interested to unravel ~5000 years of traditional knowledge with 100 years of modern science. DISHA (Development of Informatics for Societal Health Advancement) has been conceived by Dr. G.N. Sastry with the aim to leverage the activities of data driven approaches in healthcare.

In the last decade, his group is involved in developing an indigenous software, Molecular Property Diagnostic Suite (MPDS), which aims to strengthen the computational drug discovery, and thereby working towards Aatmanirbhar Bharat. Dr. Sastry is also involved in a number of outreach programs and widely traveled across the globe and has visited over 25 countries. His stays as a visiting professor (faculty) in Japan, USA, Germany and Switzerland, besides several short visits to attend and organize meetings abroad has established a strong relationship in building international collaborations across the disciplines.

Fellowships and memberships
Fellow of Indian National Science Academy (FNA)
Fellow of Indian Academy of Sciences (FASc)
Fellow of National Academy of Sciences India (FNASc)
Fellow of Royal Society of Chemistry (FRSC)
Fellow of Biotech Research Society, India (BRSI)
Fellow of Telangana Academy of Sciences (Founder Fellow)
Fellow of Andhra Pradesh Akademi of Sciences (FAPAS)
Life member of World Association of Theoretically Oriented Chemists (WATOC)
Life member of American Chemical Society (ACS)
Life member of Asia-Pacific Conference of Theoretical and Computational Chemistry (APCTCC)
Life member of Chemical Research Society of India (CRSI)
Life member of Andhra Pradesh Akademi of Sciences
Life member of Indian Biophysical Society
Life member of Bioinformatics and Drug Discovery Society (BIDDS)

Prizes and honours
Recipient of J. C. Bose National Fellowship of the Department of Science and Technology, New Delhi – 2015
Shanti Swarup Bhatnagar Prize for Science and Technology – 2011.
 B. M. Birla Scientist prize for chemistry – 2001
 The Alexander von Humboldt Fellowship
 The Swarnajayanti Fellowship – 2005 
 National Bioscience Award for Career Development 2009
 The CRSI Medal – 2010
 B. C. Deb Memorial Award for Soil/ Physical Chemistry, Indian Science Congress, 2008 
 Special Award for Promotion of Ethnopharmacology, International Congress for Society for Ethnopharmacology, 2022

Leadership activities
As the Director, Dr. Sastry has shown outstanding leadership with many major programs and creating facilities contributing to the northeast region as well as nation.

CSIR Summer Research Training Programme 2020, 16 June – 22 Aug 2020 
Drug Discovery Hackathon 2020 Training programme, 13 July 2020 - 12 Sept 2020 
Drug Discovery Hackathon 2020 Mentorship and Training programme, 30 September 2021 - 31 March 2022 
Establishment of Covid-19 testing facilities 
Dr B. K. Saikia awarded Shanti Swarup Bhatnagar 
CSIR-NEIST awarded State Science Award 2019 for Science Popularisation and Research 
Center for Petroleum Research funded by Department of Fertilizers, Ministry of Chemical and Fertilizers 
DBT funded of Center of Excellence in Advanced Computation and Data Sciences
Center for Infectious Diseases
Regional cum Facilitation Center (RCFC), National Medicinal Plant Board
BioNEST Bioincubator
NABL Accreditation for Testing/Analysis services, 2021
CSIR-Centre for Post-Harvest Processing and Research at Itanagar
Multi-locational Trial & Regional Research Experimental Field across the northeast

References

Living people
Scientists from Andhra Pradesh
Telugu people
Recipients of the Shanti Swarup Bhatnagar Award in Chemical Science
1966 births
Osmania University alumni
Indian computational chemists
20th-century Indian chemists
N-BIOS Prize recipients
University of Hyderabad alumni
Pondicherry University alumni